Bad Season is the debut mixtape by Tech N9ne released on December 23, 2010 for free digital download. The mixtape was presented by XXL Magazine and it was hosted by DJ Whoo Kid and DJ Scream. It contains 14 all-new tracks submitted by DJ Whoo Kid for Tech N9ne to rap over without prior knowledge of who produced any of the beats. Also included are three tracks from previous Tech N9ne releases. Dr. Dre, the Haitian Super Heroes (DJ Whoo Kid & Red Spyda), Travis Barker and Cookin Soul were later revealed as producers for the mixtape. The mixtape features guest appearances from Krizz Kaliko, Kutt Calhoun, Jay Rock, Big Scoob, Oobergeek, Irv Da Phenom, Nesto and others. The track "Hard Liquor" was originally by The Game with production by Dr. Dre intended for his Doctors Advocate album, but it did not make the final track listing. After the track was submitted to Whoo Kid, he then submitted it to Travis Barker to remix the track, without Tech N9ne having knowledge of the remix.

Re-release 
The mixtape was re-released through digital retailers on January 25, 2011, with physical copies being sold by the label through their web-store. The physical release was originally set for release on January 25, but due to high demand in pre-order sales, it was delayed to February 1, 2011. The retail version removes the track "Hard Liquor", as well as the tracks that had been previously released on Tech N9ne albums. The re-release adds one brand new track featuring Royce Da 5'9" as well as three a cappella verses that the artist had recorded for guest appearances with other artists. The re-release charted at #118 on the Billboard 200, selling 4,400 copies in its first week of release.

Track listing

References 

Tech N9ne albums
2010 mixtape albums
Debut mixtape albums
Albums produced by Dr. Dre
Albums produced by Seven (record producer)
Albums free for download by copyright owner